Havana Rose Liu (born 1997) is an American actress, model dancer, activist and designer. She is best known for her modeling career and her lead role in the thriller No Exit.

Early life
Liu was born and raised in Brooklyn. She is the daughter of Carley Roney and David Liu, the founders of the wedding planning site, The Knot, now known as the lifestyle company XO Group. She grew up in a bicultural and bilingual household. She began her artistic career as a dancer when she was a child. She graduated from New York University in 2019.

Career 
Prior to her street cast, Liu had never expected to become an actress. In September 2020, Liu appeared on the cover of Vogue Italia. 

Liu was first cast in a feature-length film in 2019, therefore made her acting debut in 2021 with a supporting role in the action drama Mayday. The same year, she also made her television debut with a minor role in the series The Chair. In 2022, Liu starred in two films : first in a supporting role in Josephine Decker's romantic drama The Sky Is Everywhere, then in a lead role in the thriller No Exit. Although the films received mixed reviews from critics, her performance as Darby, a recovering drug addict, in the latter work was praised. She will star in Emma Seligman's new comedic film Bottoms about two high school queer girls who start a fight club to hook up.

Personal life 

Liu opened up about her experience as an Asian woman, her self-acceptance through dance and the pressure she faced having to be vocal about her views on her identity and the world. She is pansexual.

Acting credits

Film

Television

References

External links 
 

21st-century American actresses
American female models
American jewelry designers
American LGBT actors
Pansexual actresses
American models of Chinese descent
American actresses of Chinese descent
Actresses from New York City
1997 births
Living people
LGBT models
American LGBT people of Asian descent
Women jewellers